Maniitsoq Airport  is an airport located on Maniitsoq Island,  northwest of Maniitsoq, a town in the Qeqqata municipality in central-western Greenland. It can serve STOL aircraft, although there is no deicing equipment at the airport, which is costly and problematic in Greenlandic winter.

Airlines and destinations

References 

Airports in Greenland
Davis Strait
Qeqqata
Year of establishment missing